GR Muscae, also known as 2S 1254-690  is a binary star system in the constellation Musca composed of a neutron star of between 1.2 and 1.8 times the mass of the Sun and a low-mass star likely to be around the mass of the Sun in close orbit. A magnitude 19 blue star was pinpointed as the optical counterpart of the X-ray source in 1978. Its apparent magnitude varies from 18 to 19.1 over a period of 0.16 days.

The neutron star has an accretion disk that takes around 6.74 days to complete a revolution, and is inclined at an angle to the incoming stream of material from the donor star.

References

Musca (constellation)
Muscae, GR
X-ray binaries
Neutron stars